The Hartberg megalithic tomb  is an archaeological site of the late Neolithic Age, near Schankweiler and about  south-west of Bitburg, in Rhineland-Palatinate, Germany, near the border with Luxemburg.

Description
The site, on the western slope of the Hartberg north of Schankweiler, dates from about 3000 BC. It is the only Neolithic tomb of this type in Rhineland-Palatiate. There is the lower half of a slab separating the main chamber and a poorly preserved antechamber. There were originally roof slabs, and the grave was probably once covered with a mound.

Excavation
There has been excavation of the site. Bones and pottery sherds were found in the tomb, and flint knives, flint arrowheads and pottery sherds were discovered outside; these suggested a date of about 3000 BC. There was a small beaker in the tomb, with "barbed-wire" decoration, of the early Bronze Age, suggesting that the site was in use, perhaps with interruptions, for about 1000 years. A long stone stele was found in the tomb, which may have stood above the mound.

Slabs from the tomb were later used in the early Iron Age to build a house nearby. During the Roman period or later there was quarrying from the rocky ground that forms the western wall of the tomb.

References

Megalithic monuments in Germany
Archaeology of Rhineland-Palatinate